Antonio Blanco Conde (born 23 July 2000) is a Spanish footballer who plays mainly as a defensive midfielder for Segunda División club Alavés, on loan from Real Madrid. He also plays for the Spain national team. Blanco was included in The Guardian's "Next Generation 2017".

Club career
He made his La Liga debut for Real Madrid on 18 April 2021, in a goalless draw against Getafe, coming on as a substitute. He was handed his first start three days later, in a 3–0 win over Cádiz.

In August 2022, he moved to Cádiz on a season-long loan deal. Blanco was recalled in January 2023 and joined Segunda División club Alavés until the end of the season.

International career
Due to the isolation of some national team players following the positive COVID-19 test of Sergio Busquets, Spain's under-21 squad were called up for the international friendly against Lithuania on 8 June 2021. Blanco made his senior debut in the match as Spain won 4–0.

Career statistics

Club

International

Honours

Club 
Real Madrid
La Liga: 2021–22
UEFA Champions League: 2021–22

Real Madrid Juvenil A
UEFA Youth League: 2019–20

International 
Spain U17
UEFA European Under-17 Championship: 2017
FIFA Under-17 World Cup: Runner-up 2017

Spain U19
UEFA European Under-19 Championship: 2019

References

External links

2000 births
Living people
Sportspeople from the Province of Córdoba (Spain)
Footballers from Andalusia
Spanish footballers
Association football midfielders
La Liga players
Primera Federación players
Segunda División B players
Real Madrid CF players
Real Madrid Castilla footballers
Cádiz CF players
Deportivo Alavés players
Spain youth international footballers
Spain under-21 international footballers
Spain international footballers